The 1971 Football League Cup Final took place in February 1971 at Wembley Stadium. It was the eleventh Football League Cup final and the fifth to be played at Wembley.

It was contested between Tottenham Hotspur and Aston Villa. Tottenham Hotspur were riding high in the First Division (as the top level of league football in England was then known) and Aston Villa, the most successful club of the late Victorian and Edwardian eras and a traditional heavyweight, were in the Third Division (then the third tier of English football), a level to which it had never previously sunk.

This match signalled the reversal of a long period of decline for Villa. Ten years later they were champions of England and the following year they had become the champions of Europe.

Players and officials

Road to Wembley
Home teams listed first.

External links
Match summary on Soccerbase

Specific

EFL Cup Finals
League Cup Final 1971
League Cup Final 1971
1970–71 Football League
Football League Cup Final
Football League Cup Final